Boozed was a rock 'n' roll band from the north German town of Bramsche.

History 
They were formed in 2001 of five at that time on the average of 16-year-olds, first as AC/DC cover band
. Afterwards they started to write increasingly their own songs. 

. Markus Strothmann, Klaas Ukena, 
Marvin Drosten, Michael Ponert and Tim Mischke have been since 2001 to over 250 national and international shows among other things with bands like Turbonegro, Donots, Heideroosjes,
Gluecifer, The Hellacopters, Beatsteaks, Peter Pan Speedrock, The Flaming Sideburns, Rose Tattoo and in 2009 they support the American hardrock act Monster Magnet. They have played on numerous 
festivals like Hurricane, Taubertal and Rheinkultur. After a rather average season in 2007, some concerts and festivals had to be cancelled,
Boozed separated from guitarist Marvin Drosten due to his weak health at the beginning of 2008 and was replaced with Nico Choczko. That
wasn’t easy, as the band members were pretty close friends, but looking back, it seems to have been the right decision for the band.

Music Style 
Their style shows a mixture of well-known bands such as Motörhead, Rolling Stones, Gluecifer
 and naturally AC/DC.

Discography

Albums 
 2004: Seizin the Day
 2005: Tight Pants
 2007: Acid Blues
 2009: One Mile
 2018: Self Titled

EPs 
 2007: My Friends Are Gonna Be There Too
 2009: Save Me
 2009: You Gotta Go Again

Compilations 
 2009: Bad Seed

Splits 
 2003: Drunk’n'Dangerous/Monday K.O., Split with V8 Wankers
 2004: Wild Boys/Pull Through, Split with Psychopunch
 2006: Laserlight/Dream on, Split with The Flaming Sideburns
 2007: Back In The Back Of A Cadillac, Split with December Peals

DVDs 
 2010: Boozed-History-DVD „IIIIIIIII“ (DIY)
 2011: Boozed Grande Finale DVD

Notes

External links
Official website
Boozed at Myspace

German musical groups